The 2021 Alcorn State Braves football team represented Alcorn State University in the 2021 NCAA Division I FCS football season. The Braves played their home games at Casem-Spinks Stadium in Lorman, Mississippi, and competed in the West Division of the Southwestern Athletic Conference (SWAC). They were led by fifth-year head coach Fred McNair.

Schedule

Game summaries

vs. North Carolina Central

Northwestern State

at South Alabama

at Arkansas–Pine Bluff

Grambling State

at Mississippi Valley State

at Texas Southern

at Southern

at Bethune–Cookman

No. 24 Prairie View A&M

at No. 19 Jackson State

References

Alcorn State
Alcorn State Braves football seasons
Alcorn State Braves football